Clickbot.A is a botnet that is used for click fraud.

The bot was first discovered by Swa Frantzen at SANS' Internet Storm Center in May 2006.  At that time, the botnet had infected about 100 machines.  The infected population grew to over 100,000 machines within one month.

The bot was written as a plugin to Internet Explorer that was downloaded by IE users. It operated by using victims' computers to automatically click on pay-per-click Internet advertisements.

It is also used to steal passwords from unsuspecting users.

See also

 Browser Helper Object
 Botnet
 Click farm
 Click fraud
 Download.ject
 Trojan horse (computing)
 ZeroAccess botnet
 Zombie (computer science)

References

Internet bots
Trojan horses